René Grün (18 February 1933 – 27 May 2004) was a Luxembourgian boxer. He competed in the men's welterweight event at the 1960 Summer Olympics.

References

1933 births
2004 deaths
Luxembourgian male boxers
Olympic boxers of Luxembourg
Boxers at the 1960 Summer Olympics
Sportspeople from Luxembourg City
Welterweight boxers